Callogaza colmani is a species of sea snail, a marine gastropod mollusk in the family Margaritidae.

References

External links
 To World Register of Marine Species

colmani
Gastropods described  in 2012